Steve Cook (born 1991) is an English footballer.

Steve Cook, Steven Cook or Steve Cooke  may also refer to:
Steve Cook (bodybuilder), American professional bodybuilder and former Mr. Olympia
 Steve Cook (bowler) (born 1957), American ten-pin bowler
 Steve Cook (cyclist), American former professional mountain bike racer
 Steve Cook (pool player) (1946–2003), American pocket billiards player
 Steve Cook (skier), Paralympian skier

 Steven Cook, British artist, photographer, and graphic designer
 Steven A. Cook, American foreign policy writer
 Steve Cooke (born 1970), American baseball player
 Steve Cooke (football coach), English football manager
 Steve Cooke, quizzer on BBC2's Eggheads quiz programme

See also
 Stephen Cook (disambiguation)
 Stephen Cooke (born 1982), English footballer